Seku Conneh (born 10 November 1995) is a Liberian professional footballer who plays as a forward.

Career

Youth
Born in Voinjama, Liberia, and raised in the Netherlands, Conneh began his youth development across several development academies and youth clubs, including Ajax and Almere City.

Club

Fortuna Sittard and Oss
Conneh began his professional career in the Netherlands playing for Fortuna Sittard and Oss of the Eerste Divisie for a season each scoring a total of 11 goals from 45 appearances.

Bethlehem Steel
Ahead of the 2016 USL season, Conneh joined the newly formed Bethlehem Steel, the USL affiliate of the Philadelphia Union. His first season was limited by injury but managed 2 goals in 18 appearances for Steel. During the 2017 season, Conneh would earn his first USL Player of the Week honors after scoring a brace against Cincinnati. Conneh was released by Bethlehem Steel on 2 November 2017.

Ansan Greeners
Two months after being released by Steel, Conneh joined Ansan Greeners of the K League 2, the second division of South Korean football. On 22 April, Conneh scored his first goal to equalize for the Greeners in a 3–1 victory against Bucheon.

Vojvodina
On 23 January 2019, after spending a month on a trial, Conneh signed a two-year-deal with Serbian club Vojvodina.  Unfortunatelly, with the arrival of coach Nenad Lalatovic, who admitted in an interview to fkvojvodina.com that since his arrival, Conneh has been removed from the main team and that he did not even saw him neither has any interess in doing so, it clearly meant that the new coach's discriminatory, anti-foreigners, stance meant Conneh was doomed to leave the club.

Las Vegas Lights
In December 2019, it was announced that Conneh was making his return to the USL Championship signing with Las Vegas Lights.

Monterey Bay 
On February 2, 2022, it was announced that Conneh would make another return to the USL Championship by signing with expansion side Monterey Bay. He was recruited by Frank Yallop, who was manager while Conneh was playing for Las Vegas. His contract option was declined by the club at the end of the season.

International
While raised in the Netherlands, Conneh was born in Liberia and represents them in international football. He made his debut for the Lone Stars on 15 November 2015 as a substitute in a World Cup qualifying match against Ivory Coast. Conneh has since been called up for Liberia's 2017 Africa Cup of Nations qualification run.

References

External links
 
 
 Bethlehem Steel FC - 2016 Regular Season - Roster - #36 - Seku Conneh at USL Championship
 
 Bethlehem Steel FC profile

1995 births
Living people
People from Lofa County
Association football forwards
Liberian footballers
Liberian expatriate footballers
Liberia international footballers
Fortuna Sittard players
TOP Oss players
Philadelphia Union II players
FK Vojvodina players
Las Vegas Lights FC players
Íþróttabandalag Vestmannaeyja players
Eerste Divisie players
USL Championship players
Serbian SuperLiga players
Expatriate footballers in the Netherlands
Expatriate soccer players in the United States
Expatriate footballers in South Korea
Expatriate footballers in Serbia
Expatriate footballers in Iceland
Liberian expatriate sportspeople in the Netherlands
Liberian expatriate sportspeople in the United States
Liberian expatriates in South Korea
Liberian expatriates in Serbia
Monterey Bay FC players